St. Ursula BSD is a Catholic private school, from Pre-kindergarten to Year 12, located in Bumi Serpong Damai, South Tangerang, Indonesia. The school was established in 1990. St. Ursula BSD is coeducational, different from St. Ursula Girls' School in Jakarta, Indonesia. Their logo called Serviam means "I serve". St. Ursula BSD is one of the top Catholic schools in Tangerang, often ranked among the best high schools in the country.

History
Since 1857, the Ursuline Sisters began working in Indonesia with the location in Juanda Street. Two years later, they expanded service in Road No. Pos. 2 Jakarta. Works in the School of Education is a major field of apostolate. In addition, they also developed other forms of devotion, between communities and cooperation in the field of pastoral.

Seeing the needs of education in Bumi Serpong Damai as an independent city, St. Ursula worked by establishing school education in 1990.

Curriculum
St. Ursula BSD students take Indonesian National Exams for grades 6, 9 and 12.

Performing and arts
The students perform musicals every year, but students have to audition for a part in the musical. St. Ursula also has music extracurriculars such as orchestra and traditional Indonesian music instruments such as Angklung. In arts, the school also provide painting, Batik extracurriculars and more.

Facilities
St Ursula provides many facilities to support students activities in sport, music, science labs, school computers, libraries, and many more.

Buildings
St. Ursula BSD buildings to support school activities:
Pre-kindergarten and kindergarten building
Primary school building (year 1–6)
Secondary school building (year 7–12)
Sporthall (Gym)
Auditorium

Enroll
Future students have to take the school enrollment exam and so do the students who have enrolled to St. Ursula, but the exam is only available for year 6 enrolling to year 7, and year 9 enrolling to year 10. The school will also check on the past school reports.

References

South Tangerang
Schools in Banten
Educational institutions established in 1857
Catholic schools in Indonesia
Ursuline schools
1857 establishments in the Dutch Empire